William Cummins may refer to:
 William Cummins (rugby union)
 William Cummins (Irish politician)
 William Patrick Cummins, Australian politician

See also
 William Cummings (disambiguation)